The 2018 United States Senate election in Wyoming took place on November 6, 2018 to elect a member of the United States Senate to represent the State of Wyoming. The primary election took place August 21, 2018. Republican John Barrasso won reelection with 67% percent of the vote, the lowest percentage of his three U.S. Senate campaigns and the closest a Democrat got to winning a seat since the 1996 election, while Barrasso lost only 2 counties, Teton and Albany.

Background
In 2012, incumbent Republican John Barrasso was re-elected with 76% of the vote. Heavily rural, Wyoming has the smallest population of any state and is considered the most Republican state in the nation. It has not elected a Democratic Senate candidate since 1970. In 2008, Republican presidential nominee John McCain carried the state with 64% of the vote. Republican Mitt Romney won it in 2012 with 68% of the vote, and Republican Donald Trump won it in 2016 with 67% of the vote.

Republican primary

Candidates

Nominated
John Barrasso, incumbent U.S. Senator

Declared
Dave Dodson, businessman
Rocky De La Fuente, perennial candidate, and candidate for President of the United States in 2016
John Holtz, attorney
Anthony Van Risseghem

Declined
Foster Friess, businessman (running for Governor of Wyoming)
Erik Prince, founder of Academi

Withdrawn
Charlie Hardy, Democratic nominee for U.S. Senate in 2014 and candidate for U.S. House of Representatives in 2016 (endorsed Dave Dodson)

Results

Democratic primary

Candidates

Nominated
Gary Trauner, businessman and nominee for the U.S. House of Representatives in 2006 and 2008

Declined
Mary Throne, former Minority Leader of the Wyoming House of Representatives (running for Governor)

Results

Independents

Candidates

Withdrew
 Dave Dodson, businessman (running as a Republican)

General election

Predictions

Polling

Endorsements

Results

County results

Counties that flipped from Republican to Democratic
 Albany (largest municipality: Laramie)
 Teton (largest municipality: Jackson)

Notes

References

External links
 Candidates at Vote Smart
 Candidates at Ballotpedia
 Campaign finance at FEC
 Campaign finance at OpenSecrets

Official campaign websites	
John Barrasso (R) for Senate	
Gary Trauner (D) for Senate

2018
Wyoming
United States Senate